Douglas Michael Ford Sr. (born Douglas Michael Fortunato; August 6, 1922 – May 14, 2018) was an American professional golfer and two-time major golf champion. Ford turned professional in 1949, later going on to win the 1955 PGA Championship and the 1957 Masters Tournament. He was also a member of four Ryder Cup teams (1955, 1957, 1959, and 1961) and was inducted into the World Golf Hall of Fame in 2011.

Biography
Ford was born in West Haven, Connecticut on August 6, 1922. During World War II, he served in the Coast Guard Air Division. He turned professional in 1949 and won for the first time in 1952 at the Jacksonville Open.

The win in Jacksonville was an unusual one. At the end of regulation play, Ford and Sam Snead were tied for the lead. An 18-hole playoff was scheduled for the next day but rather than play, Snead forfeited. The forfeit stemmed from a ruling Snead received during the tournament's second round of play. On the 10th hole, Snead's drive landed behind an out-of-bounds stake. While Chick Harbert, who was playing with Snead, thought the ball was out-of-bounds, a rules official ruled differently due to the starter not telling players the stakes had been moved since the previous day's play had ended. Afterwards, Snead explained why he forfeited even though Ford suggested they play sudden-death for the title. "I want to be fair about it. I don't want anyone to think I took advantage of the ruling."

Ford's first major title was the PGA Championship in 1955, which was contested at match play. He defeated Cary Middlecoff in the 36-hole final, 4 and 3. Ford was that season's PGA Player of the Year. In 1957, he holed out from a plugged lie in the bunker, on the final hole, to come from behind and beat Sam Snead by three strokes at the Masters Tournament. The last of his 19 PGA Tour wins came in 1963.

Ford played in 49 Masters Tournaments, a record that stood until Arnold Palmer played in his 50th tournament three years later. His final Masters was in 2001 at age 78; he withdrew after an opening-hole double-bogey and was asked not to participate in future tournaments.

Ford played on four Ryder Cup teams: 1955, 1957, 1959, and 1961. He was inducted into the Connecticut Golf Hall of Fame in 1972. He was inducted into the National Italian American Sports Hall of Fame in 1992. Ford was inducted into the World Golf Hall of Fame in 2011.

During the induction ceremony, Ford recalled that he showed enough promise as a baseball player that he received a contract offer from the New York Yankees. While he was considering the offer, his father asked how long he might expect to play baseball. When Doug said that he might expect to play professional baseball for about 10 years, his father responded, "Why don't you stay with the golf. You'll last forever." At the time of the ceremony, the 88-year-old Ford still regularly played casual golf.

Ford died in Palm Beach Gardens, Florida on May 14, 2018 at the age of 95.

Professional wins (34)

PGA Tour wins (19)

PGA Tour playoff record (5–7)

Other wins (12)
1956 Metropolitan Open
1957 Panama Open, Metropolitan PGA Championship, Westchester PGA Championship
1958 Metropolitan PGA Championship
1959 Eldorado Professional (tied with Sam Snead)
1960 Metropolitan PGA Championship
1961 Westchester Open, Westchester PGA Championship
1963 Westchester Open, Metropolitan PGA Championship, Westchester PGA Championship

Other senior wins (3)
1981 Merrill Lynch/Golf Digest Commemorative Pro-Am
1987 Liberty Mutual Legends of Golf - Legendary Division (with Jerry Barber)
1996 Liberty Mutual Legends of Golf - Demaret Division (with Art Wall Jr.)

Sources:

Playoff record
Senior PGA Tour playoff record (0–1)

Major championships

Wins (2)

Results timeline

CUT = missed the halfway cut
WD = withdrew
R64, R32, R16, QF, SF = Round in which player lost in PGA Championship match play
"T" indicates a tie for a place.

Source:

Summary

Most consecutive cuts made – 31 (1951 U.S. Open – 1963 Masters)
Longest streak of top-10s – 4 (1955 U.S. Open – 1956 U.S. Open)

U.S. national team appearances
Ryder Cup: 1955 (winners), 1957, 1959 (winners), 1961 (winners)
Hopkins Trophy: 1952 (winners), 1953 (winners), 1956 (winners)

See also
List of golfers with most PGA Tour wins

References

External links

American male golfers
PGA Tour golfers
PGA Tour Champions golfers
Ryder Cup competitors for the United States
Winners of men's major golf championships
World Golf Hall of Fame inductees
Golfers from Connecticut
United States Coast Guard personnel of World War II
Military personnel from Connecticut
American people of Italian descent
People from West Haven, Connecticut
1922 births
2018 deaths